The Brazilian Navy General Staff ( - EMA) is the general management body responsible for the coordination of the Brazilian Navy, the sea force of the Brazilian Armed Forces.

Mission
The EMA's mission is to study, plan, guide, coordinate, and control at the general management level, the activities of the Navy, in accordance with the decisions and guidelines defined by the Navy Command.

History
The EMA's history begin in the period of transition from the monarchic to the republican regime, through the Decree No. 430, of 29 May 1890. The Navy Ministry continued with the Armed Forces reorganizations, with the therm Navy General Staff officially created by the Decree No. 6,503 of 11 June 1907.

See also

 Future of the Brazilian Navy

External links
 Brazilian Navy
 Brazilian Ministry of Defense

References

Ministry of Defence (Brazil)
Brazil
Brazilian Navy